Palmatolepidae is an extinct conodont family. It is part of the clade Prioniodontida, also known as the "complex conodonts".

References

External links 

 Palmatolepidae at fossilworks.org (retrieved 30 April 2016)

Ozarkodinida families